Wes Piermarini (born November 19, 1982) is an American rower. He competed at the 2008 Summer Olympics and the 2012 Summer Olympics.

References

1982 births
Living people
American male rowers
Olympic rowers of the United States
Rowers at the 2008 Summer Olympics
Rowers at the 2012 Summer Olympics
People from Northampton, Massachusetts